The Georgina Basin is a large (c. 330,000 km2) intracratonic sedimentary basin in central and northern Australia, lying mostly within the Northern Territory and partly within Queensland. It is named after the Georgina River which drains part of the basin. Deposition of locally up to c. 4 km of marine and non-marine sedimentary rocks took place from the Neoproterozoic to the late Paleozoic (c. 850-350 Ma). Along with other nearby sedimentary basins of similar age (Amadeus Basin, Officer Basin), the Georgina Basin is believed to have once been part of the hypothetical Centralian Superbasin, that was fragmented during episodes of tectonic activity.

See also
Ngalia Basin
Alice Springs Orogeny

References

External links
Georgina Basin page at Northern Territory Geological Survey
http://www.nt.gov.au/d/Minerals_Energy/Geoscience/Content/File/Pubs/Record/NTGSRec2002-004.zip Georgina Basin SEEBASE Project report (April - May 2002) at Northern Territory Geological Survey (zip)

Sedimentary basins of Australia
Geology of the Northern Territory
Geology of Queensland
Proterozoic geology
Paleozoic geology
North West Queensland
Cambrian paleontological sites
Paleozoic paleontological sites of Australia